Lorenzo Sommariva (born 5 August 1993) is an Italian snowboarder. He competed in the snowboard cross at the 2018 Winter Olympics and the snowboard cross and mixed team snowboard cross at the 2022 Winter Olympics.

References

External links

1993 births
Living people
Snowboarders at the 2018 Winter Olympics
Snowboarders at the 2022 Winter Olympics
Italian male snowboarders
Olympic snowboarders of Italy
Sportspeople from Genoa
21st-century Italian people